Hiawatha is a neighborhood within the larger Longfellow community in Minneapolis. It is bordered by Howe to the north, the Mississippi River to the east, Minnehaha Park and Minnehaha neighborhood to the south, and Ericsson and Standish to the west. The Hiawatha neighborhood is bordered by 40th Street to the north, the Mississippi River to the east, 54th Street East to the south, and Hiawatha Avenue to the west.

Hiawatha Avenue Mural

The Hiawatha Avenue Mural is public art in the Hiawatha neighborhood of Minneapolis. Dedicated on June 7, 1992, the mural was sponsored in 1990 by the Minneapolis Arts Commission through the city's Art in Public Places Program. Sara Rotholz Weiner created the mural to cover 29,000 feet of the Harvest State grain elevator next to Hiawatha Avenue on the city's south side. The work was painted by Dale Hanson and John Keltgen, who worked for the Naegele Outdoor Advertising Company as billboard artists.

The Hiawatha Avenue Mural sits at the corner of Hiawatha Avenue to its west and East 41st Street to its north. It is next to a rail line that serves mills along Hiawatha Avenue, and a McDonald's franchise and car wash now exist next to the mural.

The mural's subject matter includes images from space and early 20th century life. Eight images in a vertical set along one elevator highlight a grain elevator, the Earth from its Moon, a tree-lined road, three images of planets, a paddleboat and its passengers, and an automobile and streetcar from the 1940s. Weiner designed lines leading from the eight images to the edges of the grain elevator; they represent power lines and building shadows. The artist said she envisioned the mural to be "a perpetual time piece, registering moments and change throughout the year."

From Weiner's design, Keltgen and Hanson created a line drawing and projected it onto paper which was perforated along those lines. Held against the grain elevator, the painters drew a line of charcoal through the perforations as a base tracing. On top of the charcoal, they draw full lines with a lumber crayon and finally oil paint. An article in the local newspaper further notes that the painters "used a flat rendering of the design to allow for an exact imitation of the original brush strokes created by the design artist."

References

Neighborhoods in Minneapolis
Minnesota populated places on the Mississippi River
Public art in the United States